Celerrimus is a monotypic genus of European running crab spiders containing the single species, Celerrimus duffeyi. It was first described by S. Lecigne, J.-F. Cornic and P. Oger in 2019.

See also
 Philodromus
 List of Philodromidae species

References

Further reading

Monotypic Philodromidae genera
Spiders of Europe